Ethan Cohen could refer to  the following people:

 Ethan Cohen (gallerist) (born 1961), American gallerist based in New York City.
 Etan Cohen (born 1974), Israel-born American film writer

See also 
 Ethan Coen (born 1957), Minnesota-born American film writer/director/producer of the Coen brothers